Where Does a Body End? is a 2019 Canadian documentary film directed by Marco Porsia about the American experimental rock band Swans. The film had its premiere on May 3, 2019, at the IndieLisboa Film Festival in Portugal. The film was released worldwide on September 11, 2020.

References

External links
 
 
 Watch the film on Vimeo On Demand

2019 films
2019 documentary films
Canadian documentary films
Swans (band)
2010s English-language films
2010s Canadian films
2010s American films